Thomas Elliott Odams (7 April 1907 – 4 March 1989) was an English professional golfer. Odams is remembered for being runner-up in the 1939 Open de France and a semi-finalist in the 1945 News of the World Matchplay.

Early life
Odams was born in Wimbledon, Surrey in 1907, the son of Stanley George Odams.

Golf career
Odams played for England boys against Scotland in 1923.

The 1939 Open de France was played at Le Touquet on 24 and 25 May. Odams had rounds of 71 and 70 and led by 2 strokes after the first day. A third round 69 on the second morning gave Odams a six shot lead but he scored 76 in the afternoon and was beaten by a stroke by the Argentine golfer Martin Pose who had a last round of 68.

His best finish in The Open Championship was finishing 31st in the 1947 Open Championship. He missed the cut in 1938 and 1949, his only other appearances.

In 1945 he reached the semi-final of the News of the World Matchplay losing at the final hole. He won the Southern Professional Championship in 1953.

Before World War II, Odams was assistant to Henry Cotton in Belgium and, later, professional at Royal Ghent. After the war he was professional at Grim's Dyke Golf Club.

Death
Odams died in Seaton, Devon  on 4 March 1989 aged 81.

Tournament wins
1953 Southern Professional championship

Results in major championships

Note: Odams only played in The Open Championship.

NT = No tournament
CUT = missed the half-way cut

References

English male golfers
People from Wimbledon, London
1907 births
1989 deaths